Why Does E=mc²? (And Why Should We Care?)  is a 2009 book by the theoretical physicists Brian Cox and Jeff Forshaw. This was the first full-scale book from Professors Cox and Forshaw.

Overview
The book aims to provide an explanation of the theory of relativity that is accessible to a general reader. The authors also explain what Einstein’s most famous equation, E=mc² stands for.

References 

Physics education in the United Kingdom
Popular physics books
2009 non-fiction books